100 Grand is an American game show hosted by Jack Clark. The series ran for three episodes, weekly on Sunday nights from September 15 to 29, 1963 on the highly touted "New ABC" as the network's attempt to bring back high-stakes game shows after the quiz show scandals of 1958.

When 100 Grand made its debut, it had been two years since the last quiz show with a five-figure cash prize or higher (You Bet Your Life on NBC) had aired on any broadcast network; it would be over a decade before six-figure jackpots returned to television game shows. (Large jackpots were still seen at the time on bowling shows, such as NBC's Jackpot Bowling and ABC's own Make That Spare, both of which regularly offered jackpots over $10,000, and on The Price Is Right, which moved to ABC in 1963 and had largely been spared by the scandals.)

Game play
One contestant, having possessed a knowledge or lead in a specific subject or field, asked questions of a professional on that same subject for cash. The player who stumped the professional for five weeks, had the show survived that long, would have had the privilege to answer five questions submitted by home viewers, and ended up with a grand total of $100,000 if successful.

Only two contestants appeared on the series – one questioning a Civil War expert, the other questioning an opera expert. On the third show, both professionals stumped the amateurs, both of whom were awarded $1,000 savings bonds while the professionals each won $10,000.

Episode status
The series is believed to be destroyed through wiping. A promotional video featuring the set and a contestant exists, traded among private collectors.

References

1963 American television series debuts
1963 American television series endings
1960s American game shows
American Broadcasting Company original programming
Black-and-white American television shows
English-language television shows
Lost television shows